Inga Björk-Klevby (born 1944), is the former United Nations Deputy Executive Director of the United Nations Human Settlements Programme (UN-HABITAT). She was appointed to this position by United Nations Secretary-General Kofi Annan in October 2005.

She obtained her master's degree from the Stockholm School of Economics.

Björk-Klevby has been a diplomat for many years. She has served as the Ambassador of Sweden to Kenya, Rwanda, Seychelles and the Comoros and as Permanent Representative to the United Nations Environment Programme (UNEP) and UN-HABITAT.

Later on, she became the Assistant Undersecretary of the Ministry of Foreign Affairs of Sweden who is responsible for international development cooperation policies, programmes and budget.

For over 20 years, she worked in international finance and senior management capacities with the Central Bank of Sweden, the International Monetary Fund (IMF), the World Bank, and the Asian Development Bank.  She became Executive Director for the African Development Bank where she represented Nordic countries, Switzerland and India.

Prior to her appointment as Deputy Executive Director of the UN-HABITAT, she was Ambassador of Sweden to Côte d'Ivoire, Burkina Faso, Guinea, Liberia and Sierra Leone.

References

1944 births
Living people
Swedish officials of the United Nations
Ambassadors of Sweden to Kenya
Ambassadors of Sweden to Rwanda
Ambassadors of Sweden to Seychelles
Ambassadors of Sweden to the Comoros
Ambassadors of Sweden to Ivory Coast
Ambassadors of Sweden to Burkina Faso
Ambassadors of Sweden to Guinea
Ambassadors of Sweden to Liberia
Ambassadors of Sweden to Sierra Leone
Stockholm School of Economics alumni
Swedish women ambassadors
20th-century Swedish women